William Baird of Elie DL (23 April 1796 – 8 March 1864), was the Tory Member of Parliament (MP) for Falkirk Burghs. He was first elected at the 1841 general election, and held the seat until he resigned from Parliament on 2 May 1846, by the procedural device of becoming Steward of the Chiltern Hundreds.

The resulting by-election in Falkirk was won by the Tory candidate, Henry Pelham-Clinton, known by his courtesy title "Earl of Lincoln". When Lincoln acceded to his Dukedom in 1851, Baird's brother James Baird was elected in his place.

He was born at Woodhead House in Old Monkland. He died in Edinburgh in 1861.

References

"The Bairds of Gartsherrie"

External links 

1796 births
1864 deaths
Deputy Lieutenants of Fife
Politics of Falkirk (council area)
UK MPs 1841–1847
Scottish Tory MPs (pre-1912)
19th-century Scottish people
Members of the Parliament of the United Kingdom for Scottish constituencies